

Events

Pre-1600
1430 – The Ottoman Empire under Murad II captures Thessalonica from the Republic of Venice.
1461 – Battle of Towton: Edward of York defeats Queen Margaret to become King Edward IV of England, bringing a temporary stop to the Wars of the Roses.
1549 – The city of Salvador, Bahia, the first capital of Brazil, is founded.

1601–1900
1632 – Treaty of Saint-Germain is signed returning Quebec to French control after the English had seized it in 1629.
1792 – King Gustav III of Sweden dies after being shot in the back at a midnight masquerade ball at Stockholm's Royal Opera 13 days earlier.
1806 – Construction is authorized of the Great National Pike, better known as the Cumberland Road, becoming the first United States federal highway.
1809 – King Gustav IV Adolf of Sweden abdicates after a coup d'état.
  1809   – At the Diet of Porvoo, Finland's four Estates pledge allegiance to Alexander I of Russia, commencing the secession of the Grand Duchy of Finland from Sweden.
1847 – Mexican–American War: United States forces led by General Winfield Scott take Veracruz after a siege.
1849 – The United Kingdom annexes the Punjab.
1857 – Sepoy Mangal Pandey of the 34th Regiment, Bengal Native Infantry mutinies against the East India Company's rule in India and inspires the protracted Indian Rebellion of 1857, also known as the Sepoy Mutiny.
1867 – Queen Victoria gives Royal Assent to the British North America Act which establishes Canada on July 1.
1871 – Royal Albert Hall is opened by Queen Victoria.
1879 – Anglo-Zulu War: Battle of Kambula: British forces defeat 20,000 Zulus.
1882 – The Knights of Columbus is established.

1901–present
1927 – Sunbeam 1000hp breaks the land speed record at Daytona Beach, Florida.
1936 – The 1936 German parliamentary election and referendum seeks approval for the recent remilitarization of the Rhineland.
1941 – The North American Regional Broadcasting Agreement goes into effect at 03:00 local time.
  1941   – World War II: British Royal Navy and Royal Australian Navy forces defeat those of the Italian Regia Marina off the Peloponnesian coast of Greece in the Battle of Cape Matapan.
1942 – The Bombing of Lübeck in World War II is the first major success for the RAF Bomber Command against Germany and a German city.
1947 – Malagasy Uprising against French colonial rule begins in Madagascar.
1951 – Julius and Ethel Rosenberg are convicted of conspiracy to commit espionage.
1951 – Hypnosis murders in Copenhagen
1957 – The New York, Ontario and Western Railway makes its final run, the first major U.S. railroad to be abandoned in its entirety.
1961 – The Twenty-third Amendment to the United States Constitution is ratified, allowing residents of Washington, D.C., to vote in presidential elections.
1962 – Arturo Frondizi, the president of Argentina, is overthrown in a military coup by Argentina's armed forces, ending an 11 day constitutional crisis.
1971 – My Lai Massacre: Lieutenant William Calley is convicted of premeditated murder and sentenced to life in prison.
1973 – Vietnam War: The last United States combat soldiers leave South Vietnam.
  1973   – Operation Barrel Roll, a covert American bombing campaign in Laos to stop communist infiltration of South Vietnam, ends.
1974 – NASA's Mariner 10 becomes the first space probe to fly by Mercury.
  1974   – Terracotta Army was discovered in Shaanxi province, China.
1982 – The Canada Act 1982 receives the Royal Assent from Queen Elizabeth II, setting the stage for the Queen of Canada to proclaim the Constitution Act, 1982.
1984 – The Baltimore Colts load its possessions onto fifteen Mayflower moving trucks in the early morning hours and transfer its operations to Indianapolis.
1990 – The Czechoslovak parliament is unable to reach an agreement on what to call the country after the fall of Communism, sparking the so-called Hyphen War.
1999 – The Dow Jones Industrial Average closes above the 10,000 mark (10,006.78) for the first time, during the height of the dot-com bubble.
  1999   – A magnitude 6.8 earthquake in India strikes the Chamoli district in Uttar Pradesh, killing 103.
2002 – In reaction to the Passover massacre two days prior, Israel launches Operation Defensive Shield against Palestinian militants, its largest military operation in the West Bank since the 1967 Six-Day War.
2004 – Bulgaria, Estonia, Latvia, Lithuania, Romania, Slovakia, and Slovenia join NATO as full members.
2010 – Two suicide bombers hit the Moscow Metro system at the peak of the morning rush hour, killing 40.
2013 – At least 36 people are killed when a 16-floor building collapses in the commercial capital Dar es Salaam, Tanzania.
2014 – The first same-sex marriages in England and Wales are performed.
2015 – Air Canada Flight 624 skids off the runway at Halifax Stanfield International Airport, after arriving from Toronto shortly past midnight. All 133 passengers and five crews on board survive, with 23 treated for minor injuries.
2016 – A United States Air Force F-16 crashes during takeoff from Bagram Airfield in Afghanistan.
2017 – Prime Minister Theresa May invokes Article 50 of the Treaty on European Union, formally beginning the United Kingdom's withdrawal from the European Union.

Births

Pre-1600
1187 – Arthur I, Duke of Brittany (d. 1203)
1561 – Santorio Santorio, Italian biologist (d. 1636)
1584 – Ferdinando Fairfax, 2nd Lord Fairfax of Cameron, English general and politician (d. 1648)

1601–1900
1602 – John Lightfoot, English priest, scholar, and academic (d. 1675)
1713 – John Ponsonby, Irish politician (d. 1789)
1735 – Johann Karl August Musäus, German author (d. 1787)
1747 – Johann Wilhelm Hässler, German pianist and composer (d. 1822)
1769 – Jean-de-Dieu Soult, French general and politician, 12th Prime Minister of France (d. 1851)
1780 – Jørgen Jørgensen, Danish adventurer (d. 1841)
1790 – John Tyler, American lawyer and politician, 10th President of the United States (d. 1862)
1799 – Edward Smith-Stanley, 14th Earl of Derby, English politician, Prime Minister of the United Kingdom (d. 1869)
1802 – Johann Moritz Rugendas, German landscape painter (d. 1858)
1824 – Ludwig Büchner, German physiologist, physician, and philosopher (d. 1899)
1826 – Wilhelm Liebknecht, German journalist and politician (d. 1900)
1853 – Elihu Thomson, English-American engineer and inventor (d. 1937)
1860 – William Benham, New Zealand zoologist (d. 1950)
1862 – Adolfo Müller-Ury, Swiss-American painter (d. 1947)
1863 – Walter James, Australian politician, 5th Premier of Western Australia (d. 1943)
1867 – Cy Young, American baseball player and manager (d. 1955)
1869 – Edwin Lutyens, British architect (d. 1944)
1871 – Tom Hayward, English cricketer (d. 1939)
1872 – Hal Colebatch, English-Australian politician, 12th Premier of Western Australia (d. 1953)
1873 – Tullio Levi-Civita, Italian mathematician and academic (d. 1941)
1874 – Lou Henry Hoover, American philanthropist and geologist, 33rd First Lady of the United States (d. 1944)
1883 – Donald Van Slyke, Dutch-American biochemist (d. 1971)
1885 – Dezső Kosztolányi, Hungarian author and poet (d. 1936)
1889 – Warner Baxter, American actor (d. 1951)
  1889   – Howard Lindsay, American producer, playwright, librettist, director and actor (d. 1968)
1890 – Harold Spencer Jones, English astronomer (d. 1960)
1891 – Yvan Goll, French-German poet and playwright (d. 1950)
1892 – József Mindszenty, Hungarian cardinal (d. 1975)
1895 – Ernst Jünger, German philosopher and author (d. 1998)
1896 – Wilhelm Ackermann, German mathematician (d. 1962)
1899 – Lavrentiy Beria, Georgian-Russian general and politician (d. 1953)
1900 – John McEwen, Australian farmer and politician, 18th Prime Minister of Australia (d. 1980)
  1900   – Charles Sutherland Elton, English zoologist and animal ecologist (d. 1991)

1901–present
1902 – Marcel Aymé, French author, playwright, and screenwriter (d. 1967)
  1902   – William Walton, English composer (d. 1983)
1903 – Douglas Harkness, Canadian colonel and politician, Canadian Minister of National Defence (d. 1999)
1907 – Braguinha, Brazilian singer-songwriter and producer (d. 2006)
1908 – Arthur O'Connell, American actor (d. 1981)
  1908   – Dennis O'Keefe, American actor and screenwriter (d. 1968)
1909 – Moon Mullican, American singer-songwriter and pianist (d. 1967)
1912 – Hanna Reitsch, German soldier and pilot (d. 1979)
1913 – Phil Foster, American actor (d. 1985)
  1913   – Jack Jones, British trade union leader, General Secretary of the Transport and General Workers' Union (d. 2009)
1914 – Chapman Pincher, Indian-English historian, journalist, and author (d. 2014)
1916 – Peter Geach, English philosopher and academic (d. 2013)
  1916   – Eugene McCarthy, American poet and politician (d. 2005)
1917 – Tommy Holmes, American baseball player (d. 2008)
  1917   – Ieuan Maddock, Welsh scientist and nuclear researcher (d. 1988)
1918 – Pearl Bailey, American actress and singer (d. 1990)
  1918   – Lê Văn Thiêm, Vietnamese mathematician and academic (d. 1991)
  1918   – Sam Walton, American businessman, founded Walmart and Sam's Club (d. 1992)
1919 – Eileen Heckart, American actress (d. 2001)
1920 – John M. Belk, American businessman and politician (d. 2007)
  1920   – Clarke Fraser, American-Canadian geneticist and academic (d. 2014)
  1920   – Pierre Moinot, French author (d. 2007)
  1920   – Theodore Trautwein, American lawyer and judge (d. 2000)
1921 – Sam Loxton, Australian cricketer, footballer, and politician (d. 2011)
1923 – Geoff Duke, English-Manx motorcycle racer (d. 2015)
  1923   – Betty Binns Fletcher, American lawyer and judge (d. 2012)
1926 – Vladimir Bolotin, Russian physicist (d. 2008)
1927 – Martin Fleischmann, British chemist (d. 2012)
  1927   – John McLaughlin, American journalist and producer (d. 2016)
  1927   – John Vane, English pharmacologist and academic, Nobel Prize laureate (d. 2004)
1928 – Romesh Bhandari, Pakistani-Indian politician, 13th Foreign Secretary of India (d. 2013)
  1928   – Keith Botsford, Belgian-American journalist, author, and academic (d. 2018)
  1928   – Vincent Gigante, American boxer and mobster (d. 2005)
1929 – Sheila Kitzinger, English activist, author, and academic (d. 2015)
  1929   – Richard Lewontin, American biologist, geneticist, and academic (d. 2021)
  1929   – Lennart Meri, Estonian director and politician, 2nd President of Estonia (d. 2006)
  1929   – Utpal Dutt, Indian actor, director and playwright (d. 1993)
1930 – Anerood Jugnauth, Mauritian lawyer and politician, 4th President of Mauritius (d. 2021)
1931 – Aleksei Gubarev, Russian general, pilot and cosmonaut (d. 2015)
  1931   – Norman Tebbit, English journalist and politician, Chancellor of the Duchy of Lancaster
1935 – Ruby Murray, Northern Irish singer (d. 1996)
1936 – Richard Rodney Bennett, English-American composer and educator (d. 2012)
  1936   – John A. Durkin, American lawyer and politician (d. 2012)
  1936   – Joseph P. Teasdale, American lawyer and politician, 48th Governor of Missouri (d. 2014)
1937 – Roberto Chabet, Filipino painter and sculptor (d. 2013)
  1937   – Smarck Michel, Haitian businessman and politician, 6th Prime Minister of Haiti (d. 2012)
  1937   – Gordon Milne, English footballer
1939 – Roland Arnall, French-American businessman and diplomat, 63rd United States Ambassador to the Netherlands (d. 2008)
  1939   – Hanumant Singh, Indian cricketer (d. 2006)
1940 – Ray Davis, American bass singer (d. 2005)
1942 – Scott Wilson, American actor (d. 2018)
1943 – John Major, English banker and politician, Prime Minister of the United Kingdom
  1943   – Vangelis, Greek keyboard player and songwriter (d. 2022)
1945 – Speedy Keen, English singer-songwriter, keyboard player, and producer (d. 2002)
1946 – Billy Thorpe, English-Australian singer-songwriter, guitarist, and producer (d. 2007)
1947 – Frank Bowe, American academic (d. 2007)
  1947   – Robert Gordon, American singer and actor (d. 2022)
1948 – Barbara Clare Foley, American author and educator
1949 – Michael Brecker, American saxophonist and composer (d. 2007)
  1949   – Joe Ehrmann, American football player and writer
  1949   – Israel Finkelstein, Israeli archaeologist and professor
  1949   – Dave Greenfield, English musician (d. 2020)
  1949   – Pauline Marois, Canadian social worker and politician, 30th Premier of Quebec
1950 – Mory Kanté, Guinean vocalist (d. 2020)
1951 – David Cheriton, Canadian computer scientist, mathematician and businessman
  1951   – William Clarke, American harmonica player (d. 1996)
  1951   – Roger Myerson, American economist and professor
  1951   – Nick Ut, Vietnamese-American photographer
1952 – Jo-Ann Mapson, American author
  1952   – Teófilo Stevenson, Cuban boxer and engineer (d. 2012)
  1952   – Bola Tinubu, Nigerian politician, President-elect of Nigeria
  1952   – Alec Wilkinson, American writer
1954 – Mario Clark, American football player
  1954   – Martha A. Sandweiss, American historian
  1954   – Suzanna Sherry, American legal scholar
  1954   – Evelyn C. White, American writer and editor
1955 – Earl Campbell, American football player
  1955   – Gillian Conoley, American poet
  1955   – Brendan Gleeson, Irish actor
  1955   – Marina Sirtis, British-American actress
1956 – Patty Donahue, American singer (d. 1996)
  1956   – Mary Gentle, English author
  1956   – William Gurstelle, American writer and inventor
  1956   – Ted Staunton, Canadian author
  1956   – Kurt Thomas, American gymnast (d. 2020)
1957 – Elizabeth Hand, American author
  1957   – Mark Hudson, British writer, journalist and art critic
  1957   – Christopher Lambert, American-French actor
  1957   – Kathryn Tanner, American theologian
1958 – Travis Childers, American businessman and politician
  1958   – Nouriel Roubini, Iranian-American economic consultant, economist and writer
1959 – Brad McCrimmon, Canadian ice hockey player and coach (d. 2011)
1960 – Jo Nesbø, Norwegian writer, musician and football player
1961 – Todd G. Buchholz, American economist and author
  1961   – Helen Humphreys, Canadian poet and novelist
  1961   – Amy Sedaris, American actress and comedian
  1961   – Michael Winterbottom, English director and producer
1962 – Billy Beane, American baseball player and manager
  1962   – Igor Klebanov, Ukrainian-American theoretical physicist
  1962   – Kirk Triplett, American golfer
1963 – Padraic Kenney, American writer, historian and educator
1964 – Catherine Cortez Masto, American attorney and politician
  1964   – Elle Macpherson, Australian model and actress
1965 – Todd F. Davis, American poet and critic
  1965   – Ayun Halliday, American writer and actor
  1965   – Brooks Hansen, American novelist, screenwriter and illustrator
  1965   – Maia Szalavitz, American journalist and author
  1965   – Bradford Tatum, American actor
1966 – Dwayne Harper, American football player
1967 – Michel Hazanavicius, French director, producer, and screenwriter
  1967   – Brian Jordan, American baseball player and sportscaster
  1967   – Edmundo Paz Soldán, Bolivian writer
1968 – Chris Calloway, American football player
  1968   – Lucy Lawless, New Zealand actress
1969 – Ted Lieu, American politician and AFRC colonel
  1969   – Jimmy Spencer, American football player and coach
1970 – J. A. Konrath, American author
1971 – Robert Gibbs, American political adviser, 28th White House Press Secretary
  1971   – Lara Logan, South African television and radio journalist and war correspondent
  1971   – Hidetoshi Nishijima, Japanese actor
1972 – Ernest Cline, American novelist, poet and screenwriter
  1972   – Stina Leicht, American author
  1972   – Priti Patel, British Indian politician, Secretary of State for the Home Department
1973 – Marc Overmars, Dutch footballer and coach
1974 – Alex Cuba, Cuban-Canadian singer-songwriter
1976 – Jennifer Capriati, American tennis player
1977 – Nina Riggs, American writer and poet
1978 – Ian Holding, Zimbabwean writer
1979 – Luis Ortiz, Cuban boxer
1980 – Hamzah bin Hussein, Jordanian prince
  1980   – Molly Brodak, American poet and writer (d. 2020)
  1980   – Chris D'Elia, American stand-up comedian, actor and writer
  1980   – Bill Demong, American skier
1981 – Jasmine Crockett, American attorney and politician
  1981   – Megan Hilty, American actress and singer
  1981   – PJ Morton, American musician, singer, songwriter and record producer
  1981   – Jlloyd Samuel, Trinidadian footballer (d. 2018)
1983 – Efstathios Aloneftis, Greek-Cypriot footballer
  1983   – Chokwe Antar Lumumba, American attorney, activist and politician
1985 – Fernando Amorebieta, Venezuelan footballer
1986 – Sylvan Ebanks-Blake, English footballer
  1986   – Lucas Elliot Eberl, American actor and director
1989 – James Tomkins, English footballer
1990 – Lyle Taylor, English footballer
1991 – Irene, South Korean idol, actress and television host
  1991   – N'Golo Kanté, French footballer
1993 – Thorgan Hazard, Belgian footballer
1994 – Jung Jae-won, South Korean rapper, singer-songwriter, and actor
  1994   – Matt Olson, American baseball player
1996 – Wade Baldwin IV, American basketball player

Deaths

Pre-1600
500  – Gwynllyw, Welsh king and religious figure
1058 – Pope Stephen IX (b. 1020)
1461 – Henry Percy, 3rd Earl of Northumberland, English politician (b. 1421)
  1461   – Lionel Welles, 6th Baron Welles (c. 1406)

1601–1900
1628 – Tobias Matthew, English archbishop and academic (b. 1546)
1629 – Jacob de Gheyn II, Dutch painter and engraver (b. 1565)
1697 – Nicolaus Bruhns, Danish-German organist, violinist, and composer (b. 1665)
1703 – George Frederick II, Margrave of Brandenburg-Ansbach, (b. 1678)
1751 – Thomas Coram, English captain and philanthropist, founded Foundling Hospital (b. 1668)
1772 – Emanuel Swedenborg, Swedish astronomer, philosopher, and theologian (b. 1688)
1777 – Johann Heinrich Pott, Prussian physician and chemist (b. 1692)
1788 – Charles Wesley, English missionary and poet (b. 1707)
1792 – Gustav III, Swedish king (b. 1746)
1800 – Marc René, marquis de Montalembert, French general and engineer (b. 1714)
1803 – Gottfried van Swieten, Dutch-Austrian librarian and diplomat (b. 1733)
1822 – Johann Wilhelm Hässler, German pianist and composer (b. 1747)
1824 – Hans Nielsen Hauge, Norwegian lay minister, social reformer and author (b. 1771)
1826 – Johann Heinrich Voss, German poet, translator and academic (b. 1751)
1830 – James Rennell, English geographer, historian and oceanography pioneer (b. 1742)
1848 – John Jacob Astor, German-American businessman (b. 1763)
1866 – John Keble, English priest and poet (b. 1792)
1888 – Charles-Valentin Alkan, French pianist and composer (b. 1813)
1891 – Georges Seurat, French painter (b. 1859)

1901–present
1903 – Gustavus Franklin Swift, American business executive (b. 1839)
1906 – Slava Raškaj, Croatian painter (b. 1878)
1911 – Alexandre Guilmant, French organist and composer (b. 1837)
1912 – Henry Robertson Bowers, Scottish lieutenant and explorer (b. 1883)
  1912   – Robert Falcon Scott, English lieutenant and explorer (b. 1868)
  1912   – Edward Adrian Wilson, English physician and explorer (b. 1872)
1915 – William Wallace Denslow, American illustrator and caricaturist (b. 1856)
1921 – John Burroughs, American naturalist and nature essayist (b. 1837)
1924 – Charles Villiers Stanford, Irish composer and conductor (b. 1852)
1934 – Otto Hermann Kahn, German-American banker and philanthropist (b. 1867)
1937 – Karol Szymanowski, Polish pianist and composer (b. 1882)
1940 – Alexander Obolensky, Russian-English rugby player and soldier (b. 1916)
1948 – Harry Price, English parapsychologist and author (b. 1881)
1957 – Joyce Cary, Anglo-Irish novelist (b. 1888)
1959 – Barthélemy Boganda, African priest and politician, 1st Prime Minister of the Central African Republic (b. 1910)
1963 – Gaspard Fauteux, Canadian dentist and politician, 19th Lieutenant Governor of Quebec (b. 1898)
  1963   – Frances Jenkins Olcott, American author and librarian (b. 1872)
1966 – Stylianos Gonatas, Greek Army officer and Prime Minister of Greece (b. 1876)
1970 – Anna Louise Strong, American journalist and author (b. 1885)
1971 – Dhirendranath Datta, Pakistani lawyer and politician (b. 1886)
1972 – J. Arthur Rank, English businessman, founded Rank Organisation (b. 1888)
1979 – Nikos Petzaropoulos, Greece footballer (b. 1927)
1981 – Eric Williams, Trinidadian historian and politician, 1st Prime Minister of Trinidad and Tobago (b. 1911)
1982 – Walter Hallstein, German academic and politician, 1st President of the European Commission (b. 1901)
  1982   – Frederick George Mann, British organic chemist (b. 1897)
  1982   – Carl Orff, German composer and educator (b. 1895)
  1982   – Nathan Farragut Twining, American general (b. 1897)
1985 – Luther Terry, American physician and academic, 9th Surgeon General of the United States (b. 1911)
  1985   – Janet Watson, British geologist (b. 1923)
1988 – Maurice Blackburn, Canadian composer and conductor (b. 1914)
  1988   – Ted Kluszewski, American baseball player and coach (b. 1924)
1991 – Guy Bourdin, French photographer (b. 1928)
1992 – Paul Henreid, American actor (b. 1908)
1994 – Bill Travers, English actor, director, and screenwriter (b. 1922)
1995 – Mort Meskin, American illustrator (b. 1916)
  1995   – Terry Moore, American baseball player and coach (b. 1912)
1996 – Bill Goldsworthy, Canadian ice hockey player (b. 1944)
1997 – Norman Pirie, British biochemist and virologist (b. 1907)
1999 – Joe Williams, American jazz singer (b. 1918)
2001 – Helge Ingstad, Norwegian lawyer, academic, and explorer (b. 1899)
  2001   – John Lewis, American pianist and composer (b. 1920)
2003 – Carlo Urbani, Italian physician and microbiologist (b. 1956)
2004 – Lise de Baissac, Mauritian-born SOE agent (b. 1905)
  2004   – Joel Feinberg, American philosopher and academic (b. 1926)
2006 – Salvador Elizondo, Mexican author and poet (b. 1932)
2007 – Larry L'Estrange, English rugby player and soldier (b. 1934)
2009 – Vladimir Fedotov, Russian footballer and manager (b. 1943)
  2009   – Andy Hallett, American actor and singer (b. 1975)
2011 – Ângelo de Sousa, Portuguese painter and sculptor (b. 1938)
  2011   – Iakovos Kambanellis, Greek author, poet, playwright, and screenwriter (b. 1921)
2012 – Pap Cheyassin Secka, Gambian lawyer and politician, 8th Attorney General of the Gambia (b. 1942)
  2012   – Bill Jenkins, American race car driver and engineer (b. 1930)
2013 – Reginald Gray, Irish-French painter (b. 1930)
  2013   – Brian Huggins, English-Canadian journalist and actor (b. 1931)
  2013   – Ralph Klein, Canadian journalist and politician, 12th Premier of Alberta (b. 1942)
  2013   – Art Phillips, Canadian businessman and politician, 32nd Mayor of Vancouver (b. 1930)
2014 – Marc Platt, American actor and dancer (b. 1913)
2015 – William Delafield Cook, Australian-English painter (b. 1926)
2016 – Patty Duke, American actress (b. 1946)
2017 – Alexei Abrikosov, Russian physicist, 2003 Nobel laureate in Physics (b. 1928)
2019 – Agnès Varda, French film director (b. 1928)
2020 – Joe Diffie, American country music singer (b. 1958)
  2020   – Alan Merrill, American musician (b. 1951)
  2020   – Krzysztof Penderecki, Polish composer and conductor (b. 1933)

Holidays and observances
 Christian feast day:
 Armogastes
 Berthold of Calabria
 Gwynllyw
 Jonas and Barachisius
 March 29 (Eastern Orthodox liturgics)
 Boganda Day (Central African Republic)
 Commemoration of the 1947 Rebellion (Madagascar)
 National Vietnam War Veterans Day (United States)
 Day of the Young Combatant (Chile)
 Youth Day (Taiwan)

References

External links

 BBC: On This Day
 
 Historical Events on March 29

Days of the year
March